Ghin-Doo-Ee  is a national park in New South Wales, Australia, 200 km northeast of Sydney. Its name comes from the Gadjang word for the Australian brushturkey.

The average elevation of the terrain is 250 meters.

See also
 Protected areas of New South Wales

References

National parks of the Hunter Region
Protected areas established in 1999
Mid-Coast Council
1999 establishments in Australia